Šaulić is a Serbian surname and family with origin in Old Herzegovina, subfamily of the Jakšić of Drobnjaci clan.

Notable people

Jelena Šaulić, Montenegrin teacher
Šaban Šaulić, Serbian musician

Surnames